Vesterbro is a neighbourhood of Aarhus, Denmark. It is located in the Aarhus C district, west of the city centre of Indre By. Vesterbro used to be farmland outside the city walls, and the neighbourhood's development progressed, when the city walls of Aarhus were demolished in 1851.

Description
The neighbourhood of Vesterbro is part of Midtbyen and comprise the area between the university, Indre By, the broad railway yard bordering Frederiksbjerg, Aabyhøj and Aarhus V. The oldest part of Vesterbro is located close to Indre By. Places of interest includes the Aarhus Botanical Gardens, the open-air museum of Den Gamle By (one of Denmark's most popular attractions), the hospital of Amtssygehuset and the culture centre of Godsbanen. The main square of Vesterbro Torv used to be a market square for the trading of livestock such as pigs in the 1880s. Now it is probably the busiest junction on Vesterbro. 

The inner part of Vesterbro comprise the residential quarters of Ø-gade kvarteret (lit.: the island-street quarter), where most streets are named after Danish islands and CeresByen, a new quarter currently being built on the grounds of the former Ceres Brewery.

Gallery

References

Sources

Vesterbro: Danish

Aarhus C
Neighborhoods of Aarhus